was a Japanese film actress.

Career
Kuwano was born in Shiba ward, Tokyo. After graduating from Mita High School in 1932, she first worked as a "sweets girl" for Morinaga & Company before entering the Shochiku film studios in 1934, where she gave her debut in Hiroshi Shimizu's Eclipse. In addition to many films directed by Shimizu, she starred in films by Yasujirō Ozu and Yasujirō Shimazu. In 1946, she collapsed on the set of Kenji Mizoguchi's Victory of Women. She is the mother of actress Miyuki Kuwano.

Selected filmography
 1934: Eclipse
 1936: Mr. Thank You
 1937: What Did the Lady Forget?
 1939: A Brother and His Younger Sister
 1940: The Legend of Tank Commander Nishizumi
 1942: Brothers and Sisters of the Toda Family
 1946: Victory of Women

References

External links
 

1915 births
1946 deaths
Japanese film actresses